Hadley Fergus Hicks (April 1, 1933 – June 21, 2016) was an American football and baseball coach and author.  He served as the head football coach at Sterling College in Sterling, Kansas for two seasons, from 1988 to 1989, compiling a record of 3–16.

Before coaching in college, Hicks was prominent in Arizona athletics and served on the board of the Arizona Athletic Hall of Fame.  He also later wrote stories about his work in high school and college athletics.  Hicks also played baseball at Arizona State University and later for one year in the minor leagues with the Pulaski Cubs.

Head coaching record

References

External links
 

1933 births
2016 deaths
Baseball outfielders
Arizona State Sun Devils baseball players
Pulaski Cubs players
Sterling Warriors baseball coaches
Sterling Warriors football coaches
People from Bisbee, Arizona
Baseball players from Arizona